Victor Tadashi Suarez is an Emmy award-winning American director of photography recognized for his documentary filmmaking. He is the cinematographer for The Weekly, from The New York Times.

Victor is the director of photography for several feature films including The Infinite Race (2020), for ESPN's 30 for 30 series, and Harvest Season (2018) from Independent Lens.

In 2020, he received the Edward R Murrow award for his work on Collision, a New York Times documentary following Rukmini Callimachi as she investigates the deaths of two American cyclists in Tajikistan.

From 2013 - 2018 he was the cinematographer for the Al Jazeera English docu-series, Fault Lines, during which time he received seven News and Documentary Emmy nominations for his filmmaking.

Victor graduated from Columbia University in New York in 2011,

Awards and nominations 

 2020 - News & Documentary Emmy Award nomination for Outstanding Video Journalism, Collision
 2020 - News & Documentary Emmy Award winner for Outstanding Coverage of a Breaking News Story in a News Magazine, The Siege of Culiacan
 2020 - Overseas Press Club winner of the Edward R Murrow Award, Collision
 2018 - News & Documentary Emmy Award winner for Outstanding Continuing Coverage of a News Story in a News Magazine, The Ban
 2018 - News & Documentary Emmy Award nomination for Outstanding Science, Medical, and Environmental Report, Heroin's Children
 2018 - News & Documentary Emmy Award nomination for Best Story in a News Magazine, Heroin's Children
 2017 - News & Documentary Emmy Award nomination for Outstanding Science, Medical, and Environmental Report, Standing Rock and the Battle Beyond
 2016 - News & Documentary Emmy Award nomination for Outstanding Investigative Journalism in a News Magazine, Forgotten Youth: Inside America's Prisons
 2016 - News & Documentary Emmy Award nomination for Outstanding Business and Economic Reporting in a News Magazine, Conflicted: The Fight for Congo's Minerals
 2016 - News & Documentary Emmy Award nomination for Outstanding Coverage of a Breaking News Story in a News Magazine, Baltimore Rising
 2015 - News & Documentary Emmy Award nomination for Outstanding Coverage of a Breaking News Story in a News Magazine, Ferguson: City Under Siege

References

External links 

 

American cinematographers
Living people
1989 births